Mark Spalding (born 1960) is an English actor.

Mark Spalding may also refer to:
J. Mark Spalding (born 1965), American Catholic prelate